is a Japanese professional basketball player for the Saga Ballooners of the B.League in Japan.

He also has played a role as a member of the Japanese national team.  As a member of the national team, he participated in the EABA Championship 2017, and praised the coach Luka Pavicevic.

Mitsuhara went 9-for-12 from the field in a 23-point outing against the Brave Thunders on April 22, 2017. On October 29,  he scored 11 points on 3-for-3 shooting in a win against B-Corsairs. Mitsuhara went 3-for-14 from the field and scored 12 points in a loss to Alvark on December 23.

Stats

Regular season 

|-
| align="left" |  2013-14
| align="left" | Hitachi
| 53||5 || 15.3|| .351|| .369|| .659|| 2.6|| 0.9|| 0.4|| 0.1||  5.2 
|-
| align="left" |  2014-15
| align="left" | Hitachi
| 49||6 || 12.6|| .370|| .245|| .679|| 3.1|| 0.6|| 0.2|| 0.1|| 4.5 
|-
| align="left" |  2015-16
| align="left" | Hitachi
| 52|| || 10.4|| .374|| .258|| .636|| 2.1|| 0.4|| 0.2|| 0.1||  3.2 
|-
| align="left" | 2016-17
| align="left" | Shibuya
|58  || 15 ||20.8  ||.349  ||.243  || .667 || 4.2 || 1.4 ||0.4  || 0.1 ||6.7  
|-
| align="left" | 2017-18
| align="left" | Shibuya
|57  || 42 ||20.1  ||.361  ||.209  || .689 || 4.6 || 1.8 ||0.4  || 0.1 ||6.2  
|-
| align="left" | 2018-19
| align="left" | Shibuya
|54  || 10 ||10.52  ||.343  ||.222  || .579 || 2.6 || 0.7 ||0.24  || 0.04 ||2.1  
|-
|}

Early cup games 

|-
|style="text-align:left;"|2017
|style="text-align:left;"|Shibuya
| 2 || 2 || 23.35 || .333 || .375 || 1.000 || 4.5 || 1.5 || 0 || 0 || 8.5
|-
|style="text-align:left;"|2018
|style="text-align:left;"|Shibuya
|3 || 2 || 26.54 || .368 || .000 || 1.000 || 6.3 || 2.3 || 0.33 || 0 || 5.3
|-

External links

References

1989 births
Living people
Tokai University alumni
Japanese men's basketball players
Ryukyu Golden Kings players
Sportspeople from Yokohama
Sun Rockers Shibuya players
Power forwards (basketball)